Acajete is a town in the Mexican state of Puebla.  It is the capital of the municipality of the same name. The settlement was founded in 1521 by the Spanish.

References 

Populated places in Puebla
Populated places established in 1521